The 2018–19 George Washington Colonials women's basketball team will represent George Washington University during the 2018–19 NCAA Division I women's basketball season. The Colonials, led by third year head coach Jennifer Rizzotti, play their home games at Charles E. Smith Center and were members of the Atlantic 10 Conference. They finished the season 10–20, 7–9 in A-10 play to finish in a 3 way tie for eighth place. They lost in the first round of the A-10 women's tournament to Saint Joseph's.

Media

WRGW will carry the Colonials games and broadcast them online at GWRadio.com. The A-10 Digital Network will carry all non-televised Colonials home games and most conference road games through RaiseHigh Live.

Roster

Schedule

|-
!colspan=9 style=| Non-conference regular season

|-
!colspan=9 style=| Atlantic 10 regular season

|-
!colspan=9 style=| Atlantic 10 Women's Tournament

Rankings
2018–19 NCAA Division I women's basketball rankings

See also
 2018–19 George Washington Colonials men's basketball team

References

George Washington
George Washington Colonials women's basketball seasons